Washington Township is an inactive township in Laclede County, in the U.S. state of Missouri.

Washington Township was established in 1874, taking its name from President George Washington.

References

Townships in Missouri
Townships in Laclede County, Missouri